Shaina Taub is an American singer, composer and musician.

Biography
Taub graduated from New York University Tisch School of the Arts.

Taub composed and starred in three adaptations of Shakespeare plays for The Public Theater's Public Works program: Twelfth Night in both 2016 and 2018 and As You Like It in 2017

Taub has appeared Off-Broadway in the revival of the revue show Old Hats in 2016, Natasha, Pierre and the Great Comet of 1812 (2013), and Hadestown (2016).

She played the role of Emma Goldman in the Ragtime on Ellis Island concert.

She performs at Joe's Pub in Manhattan monthly.

Alongside Elton John on music, Taub penned the lyrics for the upcoming musical adaptation of The Devil Wears Prada, based on Lauren Weisberger's novel of the same name.

Awards 
 2014 Jonathan Larson Award recipient 
 2017 Fred Ebb Award recipient 
 2019 Kleban Prize, most promising lyricist award which includes a $100,000 monetary award

References

External links
Internet Off-Broadway database

Living people
Year of birth missing (living people)
Tisch School of the Arts alumni
21st-century American women singers
21st-century American singers